Iconi (or Ikoni) is a town on the island of Grande Comore in the Comoros.

Comorian Olympic hurdler Maoulida Darouèche was born here.

Populated places in Grande Comore